Yosef Haim Shapira (born 5 July 1945) is an Israeli attorney and judge who served as the seventh State Comptroller of Israel from July 2012 to July 2019.

Biography 
Shapira was born in Jerusalem. He earned a law degree at the Hebrew University of Jerusalem in 1971 and in 1972 was certified as a lawyer. As part of his reserve duty, he served as a judge at the IDF's Military Court of Appeals, as a colonel. In 2000 he received a Master's degree in criminology from the University of Leicester in England.

Shapira is married and a father of three.

Judicial career
Between 2001–2003 he was Vice Chairman of the National Disciplinary Tribunal of the Israeli Bar Association. In July 2003 he was appointed a judge of HaShalom courts in the District of Jerusalem. In May 2005 he was appointed a judge of the District Court of Jerusalem.

Notable rulings include the opening of the Karta parking lot for businesses on Shabbat, the 2007 ruling in favor of an appointment of an Arab director for the JNF, and his 2008 ruling against the dismantling of Hamas in Jerusalem.

References 

20th-century Israeli judges
State Comptrollers of Israel
People from Jerusalem
Hebrew University of Jerusalem Faculty of Law alumni
Israeli Jews
1945 births
Living people
20th-century Israeli civil servants
21st-century Israeli civil servants
21st-century Israeli judges